Onezhskoye Pomorye National Park is a national park in the north of Russia, located on Onega Peninsula in Onezhsky and Primorsky Districts of Arkhangelsk Oblast. It was established on 26 February 2013. The park protects pristine forests and coastal landscapes.

History
A creation of the national park started in 1997, however, it took until 2002 to approve the boundaries. In 2013, the land was reserved for the future national park. On 22 December 2011 the Government of Russian Federation made a decision to create a national park on the Onega Peninsula, and the park was created on 26 February 2013.

Geography
The park occupies much of the Onega Peninsula and adjacent parts of the White Sea. There are no all-season means of land transportation to the mainland. Most of the area is covered by forest. Moose, eurasian brown bear, gray wolf, and red fox are common in the park. Beluga whale occurs in the White sea. In the winter, the sea is frozen.

Tourism
Park can be visited only with a permit which needs to be obtained in advance. The maximum duration of stay is ten days, with the exception of residents of the surrounding areas, who may stay in the park up to one year.

References

External links 
 

Geography of Arkhangelsk Oblast
National parks of Russia
Protected areas established in 2013
Tourist attractions in Arkhangelsk Oblast
2013 establishments in Russia